R.V. Jayakumar, MD, DM(P.G.I.), FRCP(U.K), M.N.A.M.S.  is the former Head of the Department of Medicine, Trivandrum Medical College (1997-2000) and Kottayam Medical College (1996-1997, 2000-2001).

He received his MBBS from Trivandrum Medical College (1963 batch), his MD from Trivandrum Medical College, his DM in Endocrinology from P.G.I. Chandigarh and his MRCP from UK. He became a Fellow of the Royal College of Physicians in 1994. He was the first person in India to pass the MNAMS exam in Endocrinology in 1978. He is considered a brilliant teacher, having instructed or been examiner to a whole generation of medical students, M.D. students and D.M. students in India, a national figure in the field of Endocrinology. He was the first malayalee to become president of the Endocrine Society of India. Presently he is a Director & CEO of Indian Institute of Diabetes(Govt. of Kerala Undertaking) and consultant Endocrinologist at Aster Medicity, Cochin.  He is the chairman of the Indian Thyroid Society.

References

Living people
Indian endocrinologists
Fellows of the Royal College of Physicians
Scientists from Thiruvananthapuram
Medical doctors from Kerala
Year of birth missing (living people)